Seyed Ayoub Mousavi (born 21 April 1995) is an Iranian weightlifter who won a bronze medal at the 2017 World Weightlifting Championships.

Major results

References

External links
 
 

1995 births
Living people
Iranian male weightlifters
World Weightlifting Championships medalists
Islamic Solidarity Games medalists in weightlifting
Place of birth missing (living people)
20th-century Iranian people
21st-century Iranian people
Islamic Solidarity Games competitors for Iran